Dmitri Mikhaylovich Avramenko (born 8 June 1992) is a Russian professional football player. He plays for FC Saturn Ramenskoye.

Club career
He made his Russian Football National League debut for FC Fakel Voronezh on 26 April 2012 in a game against FC Baltika Kaliningrad.

External links
 
 
 

1992 births
Footballers from Voronezh
Living people
Russian footballers
Association football forwards
FC Fakel Voronezh players
FC Metallurg Lipetsk players
FC Dynamo Bryansk players
FC Dynamo Saint Petersburg players
FC Nosta Novotroitsk players
FC Saturn Ramenskoye players
Russian First League players
Russian Second League players